Vakalis is a surname. Notable people with the surname include:

 Donna Vakalis (born 1979), Canadian modern pentathlete
 Nassos Vakalis (born 1966), American animator and film director
 Nikos Vakalis (1939–2017), Greek politician